Robenílson Vieira de Jesus (born September 24, 1987) is an amateur boxer from Brazil who won a bronze medal at the 2011 Pan American Games. He competed at the 2008, 2012 and 2016 Summer Olympics, but did not win a medal on all three occasions.

Professional boxing record 

| style="text-align:center;" colspan="8"|4 Wins (3 decisions and 1 K.O.),  0 Losses, 0 Draws
|-  style="text-align:center; background:#e3e3e3;"
|  style="border-style:none none solid solid; "|Res.
|  style="border-style:none none solid solid; "|Record
|  style="border-style:none none solid solid; "|Opponent
|  style="border-style:none none solid solid; "|Type
|  style="border-style:none none solid solid; "|Rd., Time
|  style="border-style:none none solid solid; "|Date
|  style="border-style:none none solid solid; "|Location
|  style="border-style:none none solid solid; "|Notes
|- align=center
|Win||4–0
|align=left| Eric dos Santos de Jesus
|
|
|
|align=left|
|align=left|
|- align=center
|Win||3–0
|align=left| Robinson Lavinanza
|
|
|
|align=left|
|align=left|
|- align=center
|Win||2–0
|align=left| Agnaldo Valerio Martins
|align=center|
|
|
|align=left| 
|align=left|
|- align=center
|Win||1–0
|align=left| Claudinei de Souza
|
|
|
|align=left|
|align=left|

References

External links

 
 Olympic Games 2008 at amateur-boxing.strefa.pl
 

1987 births
Living people
Sportspeople from Salvador, Bahia
Boxers at the 2011 Pan American Games
Pan American Games silver medalists for Brazil
Boxers at the 2008 Summer Olympics
Boxers at the 2012 Summer Olympics
Boxers at the 2016 Summer Olympics
Olympic boxers of Brazil
Brazilian male boxers
Pan American Games medalists in boxing
Bantamweight boxers
Medalists at the 2011 Pan American Games